Ammankovilpathi is a village located 15 km from Mecheri  in the Indian state of Tamil Nadu. This village has a population of around 2000.

References
Location from Wikimapia

Villages in Salem district